The Independent Filmmaker's Coalition (IFC) is a Kansas City-based non-profit organization dedicated to promoting independent film, video, and media production. The IFC meets at the Alamo Drafthouse in Kansas City, Missouri.

History
The IFC was founded in 1993 by Kansas City-based professional and amateur filmmakers as an organization to support independent filmmakers.

Mission
To promote regional independent film, video and media production, and provide a setting for education, artistic expression, networking, and the cooperative sharing of resources to anyone with an interest in filmmaking.

Organization
With close to 200 members, the IFC includes professional and aspiring professional filmmakers (directors, producers, editors, screenwriters, actors, technical or artistic directors and crew), film hobbyists, educators, photographers, writers, artists, musicians, theater professionals, advertising and marketing executives, film production and theater executives, and those in other various professions.

The IFC prides itself on being a democratic organization with its membership annually electing officers who serve in a voluntary capacity. Other points of pride include being an organization that:
Has a membership encompassing all ages, ethnic backgrounds, and walks of life.
Counts females as one-third of its membership even as the film industry is overwhelmingly male-dominated.
Encourages its members to engage in cooperative film ventures, helping each other gratis in making their respective films and thereby helping produce films on limited budgets.
Holds weekly meetings that frequently draw 60-75 people each week and includes opportunities for attendees to promote their film-related projects, publicly introduce themselves, and network with other filmmakers.
Each week conducts or gives members the opportunities to conduct directed screenplay readings, film screenings, film evaluations, actor monologues, auditions, and film-related seminars and workshops.

IFC members and the public are also treated to special:
Appearances of national filmmakers who share their experiences in filmmaker dialogues and screen their films at the Tivoli at Manor Square Theater.
Educational workshops conducted by national screenwriters and other filmmakers.

Membership
Annual dues are kept low (currently at $30) so they don’t prove a deterrent to becoming a member. Dues entitle members to rent IFC-owned equipment (valued at $10,000) at fees drastically below the going rental rate, as well as discounts on equipment and other services at IFC-friendly businesses.

Recurring Events
Actor's Showcase
Fantasy Filmmaker Draft
Every Picture Tells a Story
One Night Stand: 10 Hour Film Competition

External links
IFCKC Homepage
IFCKC Facebook Fan Page

References

Film organizations in the United States
Non-profit organizations based in Kansas City, Missouri